Senator Whittemore may refer to:

Benjamin Franklin Whittemore (1824–1894), South Carolina State Senate
Rodney Whittemore (fl. 2010s), Maine State Senate